Suprava Samal (born 16 June 1990 in Bhubaneshwar) is an Indian women footballer who currently plays as a defender for the India women's national football team.

International
Samal represented India at the 2010 SAFF Women's Championship and 2012 SAFF Women's Championship. She was part of the team at the Pre-Olympic Qualifiers in 2011. She played for the Combined Dutch Team in 2013.

Honours

India
 SAFF Championship: 2010, 2012, 2014

Rising Students Club
 Indian Women's League: 2017–18

Orissa
 Senior Women's National Football Championship: 2010–11

Railways
 Senior Women's National Football Championship: 2015–16

References

External links 
 Eurosport player profile

Indian women's footballers
1990 births
Living people
People from Kendrapara district
Sportspeople from Bhubaneswar
India women's international footballers
Footballers at the 2014 Asian Games
Sportswomen from Odisha
21st-century Indian women
21st-century Indian people
Footballers from Odisha
Women's association football fullbacks
Asian Games competitors for India
Indian Women's League players